Reastvere is a village in Jõgeva Parish, Jõgeva County in Estonia. Reastvere has a population of 47 (as of 1 January 2011).

The Pedja River flows through the territory of Reastvere.

Reastvere was first mentioned as Restfer in 1408.

References

Villages in Jõgeva County